Jeremy Loyd is a former professional American football player who played linebacker for the St. Louis Rams.

References

External links
2002 Iowa State Football  roster

1980 births
American football linebackers
St. Louis Rams players
Iowa State Cyclones football players
Tyler Apaches football players
Living people
People from Pittsburg, Texas